Alberta Provincial Highway No. 837, commonly referred to as Highway 837, is a short north–south highway in central Alberta, Canada.  It runs from the Highway 575 to Highway 27 in Kneehill County along the west bank of the Red Deer River in the Canadian badlands; it does not pass through any communities.  The section between Highway 575 and Highway 838 is part of the Dinosaur Trail.

Major intersections 
From south to north:

References 

837